The Newest Star of Variety (German: Der neueste Stern vom Variété) is a 1917 German silent film directed by Franz Eckstein and Rosa Porten.

Cast
 Rosa Porten
 Reinhold Schünzel
 Helene Voß

Synopsis 
Rosa Porten plays the role of the variety artiste Stella Orlanda, an intrepid young woman manoeuvring between bourgeois mentality  and the free spirit attributed to popular stage people.

References

Bibliography
 Bock, Hans-Michael & Bergfelder, Tim. The Concise CineGraph. Encyclopedia of German Cinema. Berghahn Books, 2009.

External links

1917 films
Films of the German Empire
German silent feature films
Films directed by Rosa Porten
German black-and-white films
1910s German films